The Adzhi-Bogdo is a chondrite meteorite weighing . It was found on October 30, 1949, in Govi-Altay, Mongolia.

References

External links
 Mineralogy, chemistry, and noble gas contents of Adzhi-Bogdo- an LL3-6 chondritic breccia with L-chondritic and granitoidal clasts, retrieved 21/09/2011
 Report: Meteorites from Mongolia
 Nature and Origins of Meteoritic Breccias (p. 684)
 David Hardy Collection Encyclopedia of Meteorites

See also
Glossary of meteoritics

Meteorites found in Mongolia
1949 in Mongolia